Boot is a small village in Eskdale, Cumbria, in the Lake District of England.  It forms part of the Borough of Copeland. 

There are two roads from which to access the village, one of which is the Hardknott Pass and Wrynose Pass, England's steepest road; it is closed when icy (often, during winter).

The village of Boot has two pubs: The Boot Inn (formerly The Burnmoor Inn) and The Brook House Inn; however The Woolpack Inn - Hardknott Bar & Cafe is only a short walk nearer to Hardknott Pass.

The Woolpack Inn has an adjoined brewery known as Hardknott Brewery.

There is also a water corn mill dating back to 1547 known as Eskdale Mill. Since 1970's this has been open to the public as a visitor attraction and showcases original working milling machinery driven by two overshot waterwheels. The mill underwent a £1 million refurbishment in 2019 with support from the National Lottery Heritage Fund and Copeland Community Fund.

The permanent population of Boot is 10–15, but can rise to between 90 and 120 in summer when the inn and local bed-and-breakfast and holiday cottages are full. These businesses survive on fell walkers (ramblers), the passengers of the Ravenglass and Eskdale Railway (which stops less than 300 metres from Boot), and holiday-makers from the nearby campsite and cottages. Also in the area is an old boarding house (now available to rent) and a small church.

On the moorland around one mile north of the village are five stone circles known collectively as the Burnmoor stone circles.

On 2 June 2010, Boot became the centre of a search after a shooting spree in Cumbria. The killer, 52-year-old taxi driver Derrick Bird, was found dead in woods near Boot after a four-hour manhunt. He killed 12 people and injured 11 others.

See also

Listed buildings in Eskdale, Cumbria
St Catherine's Church, Boot

References

Villages in Cumbria
Borough of Copeland